This is a list of named geological features, of various kinds, on Triton, the planet Neptune's largest moon.

Catenae (crater chains)

Cavi
Tritonian cavi are named after mythological water spirits.

Craters

Dorsa (ridges)

Fossae (ditches)

Tritonian fossae are named after sacred bodies of water.

Maculae (dark spots)

Tritonian maculae are named after water spirits from various mythologies.

Paterae (irregular craters)

Tritonian paterae are named after sacred waters and sea monsters from various mythologies.

Planitiae (plains)

Tritonian plains are named after watery realms in various mythologies.

Plana (plateaus)

Tritonian plateaus are named after legendary islands.

Plumes

Volcanic plumes on Triton are named after water spirits in various mythologies.

Regiones (regions)

Tritonian regions are named after images from various mythologies.

Sulci
Sulci are long, parallel grooves. Tritonian sulci are named after sacred rivers in the mythology of various cultures.

External links
 USGS: Triton nomenclature

Triton (Moon)x

Triton